The following is the list of episodes of the Japanese anime Nijū Mensō no Musume produced by Bones and Telecom Animation Film. The anime is set to contain 22 episodes. The episodes are directed by Nobuo Tomizawa and composed by Rikei Tsuchiya. The fictional characters are designed by Koichi Horikawa.

The series began airing first on Fuji TV on April 12, 2008. Subsequently other stations such as Kansai TV and Tokai TV began airing on April 22, 2008 and April 25, 2008 respectively. Two pieces of theme songs are used, one opening and one ending theme. The opening theme; "Kasumi [Mist]" (霞), is performed by 369 miroku while the ending theme; "Unnamed World" is sung by Aya Hirano.

Episodes

References

Niju Menso no Musume